Pieter "Piet" Marie Johan Bromberg (4 March 1917 – 27 July 2001) was a Dutch field hockey player who won a bronze medal at the 1948 Summer Olympics. He played all seven matches as forward and scored seven goals. After retiring from competitions he became a hockey coach, and between 1961 and 1969 trained the national team.

Career 
Bromberg played in Singapore with a Netherlands East-Indies team in 1937. He played club hockey in Singapore between 1937 and 1940, captaining the S.C.C. team. His stick-work and speed earned him the nickname 'the flying Dutchman'.

References

External links
 

1917 births
2001 deaths
Dutch male field hockey players
Olympic field hockey players of the Netherlands
Field hockey players at the 1948 Summer Olympics
Olympic bronze medalists for the Netherlands
Field hockey players from The Hague
Olympic medalists in field hockey
Medalists at the 1948 Summer Olympics
20th-century Dutch people
21st-century Dutch people